"So Fresh, So Clean" is a song by American hip hop duo Outkast from their fourth studio album, Stankonia (2000), featuring uncredited vocals from singer-songwriter Sleepy Brown. It was produced by longtime collaborators Organized Noize. The song reached number 30 on the US Billboard Hot 100 chart and was certified platinum by the Recording Industry Association of America (RIAA) in October 2020.

Content
Among the things and people mentioned in the song are the Chevrolet Monte Carlo and Cadillac Eldorado (both General Motors cars), the television show Showtime at the Apollo and its longtime host Kiki Shepard, and R&B singers Teddy Pendergrass and Freddie Jackson.

This song also mentions - and sexualises Anne Frank.

Lyrics: "I love who you are, I love who you ain't /
You're so Anne Frank /
Let's hit the attic to hide out for 'bout two weeks /
Rick James'n, no chains and whips /
I do suck lips 'til hips jerk in double time /
The boy next door's a freak, ha-ha!"

Sample
The song prominently features a sample from Joe Simon's "Before the Night Is Over". The song also features a sample from Funkadelic's "I'll Stay".

Chart performance
"So Fresh, So Clean" debuted at number 71 on the US Billboard Hot 100 chart dated March 3, 2001. The song eventually reached it peak at number 30 on the chart dated May 5, 2001. On October 8, 2020, the single was certified platinum by the Recording Industry Association of America (RIAA) for combined sales and streaming equivalent units of over a million units in the United States.

Music video
The music video features the duo and Sleepy Brown performing on a variety of CGI backgrounds, a beauty parlor, and a church. Ludacris, Slimm Calhoun, Chilli of TLC and members of Goodie Mob make cameo appearances in the video.

Remix
The official remix, "So Fresh, So Clean (Stankonia Remix)" features Snoop Dogg and Sleepy Brown. It appeared on the soundtrack of Snoop Dogg's movie Bones under the name "Fresh and Clean (Remix)".

Track listings

US CD single
 "So Fresh, So Clean" (radio edit) – 4:05
 "So Fresh, So Clean" (club mix) – 4:04
 "So Fresh, So Clean" (instrumental) – 4:04
 "So Fresh, So Clean" (Stankonia remix club mix featuring Snoop Dogg and Sleepy Brown) – 4:37
 "So Fresh, So Clean" (Stankonia remix instrumental) – 4:39

US 12-inch single
A1. "So Fresh, So Clean" (radio edit) – 4:06
A2. "So Fresh, So Clean" (club mix) – 4:06
A3. "So Fresh, So Clean" (instrumental) – 4:04
B1. "Gangsta Sh*t" (club mix) – 4:44
B2. "Gangsta Sh*t" (instrumental) – 4:43

UK CD single
 "So Fresh, So Clean" (radio edit) – 4:06
 "So Fresh, So Clean" (Fatboy Slim remix) – 5:48
 "Ms. Jackson" (Mr. Drunk mix) – 4:45

UK 12-inch single
A1. "So Fresh, So Clean" (album version) – 4:06
A2. "So Fresh, So Clean" (Fatboy Slim remix) – 5:48
B1. "So Fresh, So Clean" (instrumental) – 4:04

UK cassette single
 "So Fresh, So Clean" (radio edit) – 4:06
 "So Fresh, So Clean" (Fatboy Slim remix) – 5:48

European CD single
 "So Fresh, So Clean" (radio mix) – 4:06
 "So Fresh, So Clean" (instrumental) – 4:04

Australian CD single
 "So Fresh, So Clean" (radio mix) – 4:06
 "So Fresh, So Clean" (Fatboy Slim remix) – 5:48
 "Ms. Jackson" (Mr. Drunk Remix) – 4:45
 "So Fresh, So Clean" (instrumental) – 4:04

Charts

Weekly charts

Year-end charts

Certifications

Release history

Use in media
In 2017, the song appeared in the first episode of Marvel's Iron Fist. Also in 2017, it appeared on the soundtrack for the video game NBA 2K18.

References

2000 songs
2001 singles
Arista Records singles
Dungeon Family songs
LaFace Records singles
Music videos directed by Bryan Barber
Outkast songs
Songs written by André 3000
Songs written by Big Boi
Songs written by Mr. DJ